The 8th Annual Transgender Erotica Awards was a pornographic awards event recognizing the best in transgender pornography form the previous year from 15 October 2014 to 15 November 2015. Pre-nominations opened on October 29, 2015, and the public at large was able to suggest nominees using an online form. Pre-nominations closed on December 6, 2015, with the nominees announced on January 4, 2016, online on the theteashow.com website. The winners were announced during the awards on March 6, 2016. There were a total of 22 Award categories.

Two of the awards were open to fan voting after pre-nominations closed. These were the fan award which was open to all and Grooby Girl of the Year which was open to members of the Grooby Girls forums who met specific criteria regarding; a number of postings and a date to have been a member before.

Winners and nominees
The nominations for the 8th Transgender Erotica Awards were announced online on January 4, 2016, and opened to fan voting on December 6, 2015, when pre-nominations closed, online on the theteashow.com website. The winners were announced during the awards on March 6, 2016.

Awards
Winners are listed first, highlighted in boldface.

References

Transgender Erotica Awards
Pornographic film awards
21st-century awards
American pornographic film awards
Annual events in the United States
Awards established in 2008
Culture of Los Angeles
Adult industry awards